Saint Petersburg International Film Festival (Russian: Са́нкт-Петербу́ргский междунаро́дный кинофестива́ль, translit. Sánkt-Peterbúrgskiy mezhdunaródniy kinofestivál; abbreviated as SPIFF) takes place as part of the Saint Petersburg international film forum. This is Saint Petersburg's first competitive international festival for feature-length fiction films.

2013 boycott
On 22 August 2013 media reported that Wentworth Miller would boycott the festival—to protest against laws banning "homosexual propaganda" in Russia.

2012

Competition Program 
There were 14 films from different countries selected for the 2012 competition program:
White Elephant / Elefante blanco, 2012, dir. Pablo Trapero, Argentina-Spain
Our Children / À perdre la raison, 2012, dir. Joachim Lafosse, Belgium-France
Children of Sarajevo / Djeca, 2012, dir. Aida Begić, Bosnia and Herzegovina-Germany
Invasion, 2012, dir. Dito Tsintsadze, Germany-Austria
Off White Lies / Orhim le-rega, 2011, dir. Maya Kenig, Israel-France
Hotchpotch / Shir tou Shir, 2011, dir. Ebrahim Forouzesh, Iran
War Witch / Rebelle, 2012, dir. Kim Nguyen, Canada
La playa DC, 2012, dir. Juan Andrés, Colombia
Kolka Cool, 2011, dir. Juris Poškus, Latvia
The End / Al Nihaya, 2011, dir. Hisham Lasri, Morocco
I Also Want It / Ya tozhe hochu, 2012, dir. Alexei Balabanov, Russia
Inside / Yeraltı, 2012, dir. Zeki Demirkubuz, Turkey
Captive, 2012, dir. Brillante Mendoza, Finland-France-Germany-Great Britain
Road North / Tie Pohjoiseen, 2012, dir. Mika Kaurismäki, Finland

The opening and closing films 
The festival's opening film
Le grand soir, 2012, dir. Benoît Delépine, Gustave Kervern, France-Belgium 
The festival's closing film
Shadow Dancer, 2012, dir. James Marsh, Great Britain-Ireland

Out-of-competition programs 
The out-of-competition program showed films which displayed the most recent trends in world cinema as well as several retrospectives. 2012's festival had 11 out-of-competition programs:
Shooting Stars EFP
Bergman-Andersson-Donner (for the 30th anniversary of the release of I. Bergman's film Fanny and Alexander)
Movies with a taste of Honey
Movies of India without songs and dances
The Unknown Lenfilm
Films from East Asia
Films from Nordic Countries
Landmarks of Berlinale’s Forum (the best films from the international forum of young cinema)
Screenings in Honour of Filmmakers (Emir Kusturica, Nuri Bilge Ceylan, Aku Louhimies, Mihael Kalatozov)
Please meet: Jerusalem IFF
Premiere Before Premiere (pre-release screenings)

The Jury 
President of the Jury
Emir Kusturica, Serbia (Director, Scriptwriter, Producer, Actor, Composer)
Jury
Aku Louhimies, Finland (Director, Scriptwriter, Producer)
Erika Gregor, Germany (Film Historian, Expert)
Gilli Mendel, Israel (Director of Film and Media Education at the Jerusalem Film Center)
Elena Yatsura, Russia (Producer)

References

External links 
 Official site of the SPIFF

Film festivals in Russia
Culture in Saint Petersburg
Festivals in Saint Petersburg